Cass Scenic Railroad State Park is a state park and heritage railroad located in Cass, Pocahontas County, West Virginia.

The park also includes the former company town of Cass and a portion of the summit of Bald Knob, the highest point on Back Allegheny Mountain.

History
Founded in 1901 by the West Virginia Pulp and Paper Company (now WestRock), Cass was built as a company town to serve the needs of the men who worked in the nearby mountains cutting spruce and hemlock for the West Virginia Spruce Lumber Company, a subsidiary of WVP&P. At one time, the sawmill at Cass was the largest double-band sawmill in the world. It processed an estimated  of lumber during its lifetime.

In 1901 work started on the  railroad, which climbs Back Allegheny Mountain. The railroad eventually reached a meadow area, now known as Whittaker Station, where a logging camp was established for the immigrants who were building the railroad. The railroad soon reached to the top of Gobblers Knob, and then a location on top of the mountain known as 'Spruce'. The railroad built a small town at that location, complete with a company store, houses, a hotel, and a doctor's office. Work soon commenced on logging the red spruce trees, which grew in the higher elevations.

The WVP&P originally had only been interested in the red spruce for the purpose of making pulp, which would be turned into paper. It was not until several years later that the company realized that the mountain held a fortune in hardwoods, such as maple, cherry, birch and oak. The company decided that it would build a mill in the town of Cass, which could process the hardwoods.

The railroad eventually extended its track to the top of Bald Knob, the third-highest mountain peak in West Virginia. The red spruce in that area was logged out, and the track was torn up in the early 1910s. The track was also extended to a valley near the town of Spruce, at a bend in the Shavers Fork of the Cheat River. The WVP&P set up a new town there, with about 30 company houses, a large company store, a school, and a pulp mill, where the red spruce trees could be processed on the spot. The new town was also named Spruce, and the former town received its current name of Old Spruce.

In June 1942, WVP&P sold the Cass operation to Mower Lumber Company, which operated the line until July 1, 1960, cutting second-growth timber off Cheat Mountain. The mill and railroad were shut down by Mower in 1960, due to the rapid decline of the timber industry in the region.

Following the 1960 closure, the rail line, land, and all equipment and rolling stock, were sold to a holding company named the Don Mower Lumber Company (no relation to the former Mower Lumber Company), and the railroad was conveyed to the Midwest Raleigh Corporation, which started to scrap the railroad and equipment. However, a group of local businessmen, led by Pennsylvania train aficionado Russell Baum, convinced the West Virginia state legislature to make the Cass Railroad a state park.

In 1977, the Cass Scenic Railroad State Park took possession of the entire company town of Cass and the old hardwood mill there. In 2015, the Durbin and Greenbrier Valley Railroad assumed operation of the railroad under a lease agreement with the State of West Virginia.

Current operations 
Today, visitors ride on historic converted log cars (similar to flatcars), pushed along by a powerful geared logging locomotive.

The railroad owns eight Shay locomotives, one Heisler locomotive, and one Climax locomotive, which is being restored by volunteers of the Mountain State Railroad and Logging Historical Association. The Heisler and the Climax, both made in Pennsylvania, were competition to Shay's geared locomotive design.

Three trips are available: a two-hour round trip to Whittaker Station, a five-hour round trip to the abandoned site of the ghost town of Spruce  (once the coldest and highest town east of the Rockies), and a five-hour round trip to Bald Knob, the third highest point in the state.

Former company houses have been refurbished and are available for rent through Cass Scenic Railroad State Park.  A small cabin on Bald Knob is also available for rent, and cabooses can be reserved for private use as well.

Town and shop tours are available daily to visitors who would like to learn more about the town and its lumber industry, and see how the rare geared locomotives are maintained by the Cass shop crew. A tour of a recreated logging camp is available at Whittaker.

2015 transfer of operations
In October 2014, it was announced that the West Virginia Division of Natural Resources (WVDNR) was transferring their administrative responsibilities to another state agency, the West Virginia State Rail Authority (WVSRA).  Under the new arrangement, the Durbin and Greenbrier Valley Railroad (D&GV) will assume day-to-day operations of the line as part of their existing contract with the WVSRA.  D&GV will control scheduling of trains, staffing train excursions, and maintaining the railroad and its equipment.  The takeover began in 2015.

The WVDNR will maintain ownership of the right-of-way and equipment, as well as continue staffing and maintaining the non-railroad portions of the park, including the historic company town of Cass, the visitor's center, and the overnight cottage rentals that the park offers. Listed below is a table of locomotives found at Cass and Durbin.

Locomotives

See also

Bald Knob
Leatherbark Run
List of heritage railroads in the United States
List of West Virginia state parks
Steam railroad

References

Citations

Other sources

External links 
 
 Durbin & Greenbrier Valley Railroad
 Mountain State Railroad & Logging Historical Association web site
 WV Railfan website
 HawkinsRails' Cass Scenic collection
 

Heritage railroads in West Virginia
State parks of West Virginia
Railroad museums in West Virginia
Protected areas established in 1961
Logging railroads in the United States
Museums in Pocahontas County, West Virginia
Protected areas of Pocahontas County, West Virginia
Historic American Engineering Record in West Virginia
Historic districts in Pocahontas County, West Virginia
1961 establishments in West Virginia
IUCN Category III
Railways with Zig Zags
Railway lines opened in 1961